Dariusz Wolny (born 21 March 1960) is a Polish swimmer. He competed in the men's 400 metre individual medley at the 1980 Summer Olympics.

References

External links
 

1960 births
Living people
Polish male medley swimmers
Olympic swimmers of Poland
Swimmers at the 1980 Summer Olympics
Swimmers from Warsaw
20th-century Polish people